A split draw is an outcome in several full-contact combat sports, including boxing, mixed martial arts, and other sports involving striking. In a split draw, one of the three judges scores the contest in favor of one fighter, another judge scores it in favor of the other fighter, and the third judge scores the contest as a draw. The decision is announced as a draw.

Notable examples

See also

10 Point System

References

Boxing rules and regulations